Narva is a municipality and city in Estonia. It is located in Ida-Viru county, at the eastern extreme point of Estonia and European Union, on the west bank of the Narva river which forms the Estonia–Russia international border. With 54,409 inhabitants (as of 2020) Narva is Estonia's third largest city after capital Tallinn and Tartu. 

In 1944, Narva was nearly completely destroyed during the battles of World War II. During the Soviet period (1944–1991), the city's original native inhabitants were not permitted to return after the war, and immigrant workers from Soviet Russia and other parts of then USSR were brought in to populate the city. The city whose population had been, as of 1934 census, 65% ethnic Estonian, became overwhelmingly non-Estonian in the second half of the 20th century. According to more recent data, 46.7% of the city's inhabitants are citizens of Estonia, 36.3% are citizens of the Russian Federation, while 15.3% of the population has undefined citizenship.

History

Early settlement
People settled in the area from the 5th to 4th millennium BC, as witnessed by the archeological traces of the Narva culture, named after the Narva river. The fortified settlement at Narva Joaoru is the oldest known in Estonia, dated to around 1000 BC. The earliest written reference of Narva is in the First Novgorod Chronicle, which in the year 1172 describes a district in Novgorod called Nerevsky or Narovsky konets (yard). According to historians, this name derives from the name of Narva or Narva river and indicates that a frequently used trade route went through Narva, although there is no evidence of the existence of a trading settlement at the time.

Middle Ages
Narva's favourable location at the intersection of both trade routes and the Narva river was behind the founding of Narva castle and the subsequent development of the castle's surrounding urban settlement. The castle was founded during the Danish rule of northern Estonia in the second half of the 13th century; the earliest written record of the castle is from 1277. Narvia village is mentioned in the Danish Census Book already in 1241. A town developed around the stronghold and in 1345 obtained Lübeck City Rights from Danish king Valdemar IV. The castle and surrounding town of Narva (Narwa, in German) became a possession of the Livonian Order in 1346, after the Danish king sold its lands in Northern Estonia. In 1492 Ivangorod fortress across the Narva river was established by Ivan III of Moscow.

Trade, particularly Hanseatic long-distance trade remained Narva's raison d'être throughout the Middle Ages. However, due to opposition from Tallinn, Narva itself never became part of the Hanseatic League and also remained a small town – its population in 1530 is estimated at 600–750 people.

Swedish and Russian rule

Captured by the Russians during the Livonian War in 1558, for a short period Narva became an important port and trading city for Russia as a transshipment centre of goods from Pskov and Novgorod. Russian rule ended in 1581 when the Swedes under the command of Pontus De la Gardie conquered the city and it became part of Sweden. During the Russo-Swedish War (1590–1595), when Arvid Stålarm was governor, Russian forces attempted to regain the city without success (Treaty of Teusina, May 1595).

During the Swedish rule, the Old Town of Narva was built. Following a big fire in 1659 that almost completely destroyed the town, only stone buildings were allowed to be built in the central part of the town. Incomes from flourishing trade allowed rebuilding of the town center in two decades. Until World War II, the baroque Old Town underwent practically no changes, and thus became renowned all over Europe. Towards the end of Swedish rule, the defence structures of Narva were greatly improved. Beginning in 1680s, an outstanding system of bastions, planned by the renowned Swedish military engineer Erik Dahlbergh, was built around the town. The new defences were among the most powerful in Northern Europe.

During the Great Northern War of 1700–1721, Narva became the setting for the first great battle between the forces of King Charles XII of Sweden and Tsar Peter I of Russia (November 1700). Although outnumbered four to one, the Swedish forces routed their 40,000-strong opponent. Russia subsequently conquered the city in 1704.

After the war, the bastions were renovated. Narva remained on the list of Russian fortifications until 1863, though there was no real military need for it. During Russian rule Narva formed part of the Saint Petersburg Governorate.

In the middle of the 19th century, Narva started to develop into a major industrial town. Ludwig Knoop established the Krenholm Manufacturing Company in 1857. The factory could use the cheap energy of the powerful Narva waterfalls, and at the end of the century became, with about 10,000 workers, one of the largest cotton mills in Europe and the world. In 1872, Krenholm Manufacturing became the site of the first strike in Estonia. At the end of the 19th century, Narva was the leading industrial town in Estonia – 41% of industrial workers in Estonia worked in Narva, compared to 33% in Tallinn. The first railway in Estonia, completed in 1870, connected Narva to Saint Petersburg and to Tallinn.

In August 1890, Narva was the site of a key meeting between German Kaiser Wilhelm II and Russian Tsar Alexander III.

Post-World War I period
The status of Narva was resolved in a July 1917 referendum, when the district population, at that time roughly equally divided between ethnic Russians and Estonians, voted to attach itself to the newly autonomous and soon to be independent republic of Estonia. Narva became part of an independent Estonia in 1918, at the end of World War I. The town saw fighting during the Estonian War of Independence. The war started when Russian Bolshevik troops attacked Narva on 28 November 1918, capturing the city on the next day. The Russian Red Army retained control of the city until 19 January 1919.

Heavy battles occurred both in and around Narva during World War II. The city was damaged in the German invasion of 1941 and by smaller air raids throughout the war, but remained relatively intact until February 1944. However, as the focus of the Battle of Narva, the city was destroyed by Soviet bombardment and fires and explosions set by retreating German troops. The most devastating action was the bombing raids of 6 and 7 March 1944 by the Soviet Air Force, which destroyed the Baroque old town.

Soviet occupation 1944–1991
By the end of July 1944, 98% of Narva had been destroyed. After the war, most of the buildings could have been restored as the walls of the houses still existed, but in early 1950s, the Soviet authorities decided to demolish the ruins to make room for apartment buildings. Only three buildings remain of the old town, including the Baroque-style Town Hall. The civilian casualties of the bombing were low as the German forces had evacuated the city in January 1944.

Narva was effectively ethnically cleansed, as the original native inhabitants were not allowed to return after the war, and immigrant Russian-speaking workers from other parts of the USSR were brought in to populate the city. The city which population had been 65% Estonian according to the last census in 1934, became overwhelmingly non-Estonian. The main reason behind this was a plan to build a secret uranium processing plant in the city, which would turn Narva into a closed town. In 1947 nearby Sillamäe was selected as the location of the factory instead of Narva, but the existence of such a plan was decisive for the development of Narva in the postwar years, and thus also shaped its later evolution. The planned uranium factory and other large-scale industrial developments, like the restoring of Kreenholm Manufacture, were the driving force behind the influx of internal migrants from other parts of the Soviet Union, mainly Russia.

In January 1945, Ivangorod, the suburb on the eastern bank of the river was separated from Estonia (and from Narva) by the Soviet authorities, and the settlement around Ivangorod fortress was made administratively part of the neighboring Leningrad Oblast of the Russian SFSR. Ivangorod became officially a town by itself in 1954.

Restoration of Estonian independence
After Estonia regained its independence in 1991, the city's leaders, holdovers from the Soviet era, wanted autonomy, and contended that the notion of a breakaway "Transnarovan Soviet republic" in northeastern Estonia was becoming increasingly popular, but this was contradicted by polls showing 87% of the region's population opposed secession from Estonia.

In 1993, dissatisfaction with newly enacted citizenship and election laws (non-citizens were not allowed to hold office) culminated in the Narva referendum of 16–17 July 1993, which proposed autonomy for both Narva and Sillamäe, a nearby town. Although 97% voted in favor of the referendum, turnout in Narva was a mere 55%, and there were credible charges of vote rigging.

After 1991, disputes regarding the Estonian-Russian border in the Narva sector remained, as the new constitution of Estonia (adopted in 1992) recognizes the 1920 Treaty of Tartu border to be currently legal.

The Russian Federation, however, considers Estonia to be a successor of the Estonian SSR and recognizes the 1945 border between the two former national republics. Officially, Estonia has no territorial claims in the area, and which was also reflected in the new Estonian-Russian border treaty signed in Moscow on 18 May 2005. Russia failed to ratify it because, together with the ratification the Estonian parliament, approved a communiqué, which mentioned the Soviet Occupation. 

On 18 February 2014 a new border treaty was signed by both countries. However the treaty was not ratified by the parliaments of either Russia or Estonia.

Overall, by 2014, Russian residents were happy with their status as both Estonian and European Union citizens and lived peacefully alongside their compatriots.

Before the 2022 Russian invasion of Ukraine, residents mixed relatively freely with the residents across the river in Ivangorod. 

Those on the Estonian side mainly crossed to buy cheaper petrol, groats, cleaning products, pasta and sugar. Those crossing from the Russian side wanted to make use of the availability of non-sanctioned goods, entertainment facilities and overall better infrastructure.

The invasion and subsequent conflict seriously reduced cooperation between the two neighbours, especially as visas became difficult to obtain and the residents of Narva increased the take up in Estonian citizenship. Narva took many Ukrainian refugees fleeing the war and previously popular Russian TV stations among older Russophone residents were banned by the Estonian government.

On June 10, 2022, the Estonian foreign ministry summoned the Russian ambassador to protest about remarks by President Vladimir Putin praising Peter the Great for having captured Narva in the early 18th century.

In August 2022, a Soviet T-34 tank memorial was removed from a stretch of road between the city centre and Narva-Jõesuu, to mixed responses. It was moved to the Estonian War Museum in Viimsi near Tallinn. In response to the tank's removal, the following month Russian authorities erected a similar T-34 tank monument in Ivangorod near the border crossing point with Narva.

Demographics
On 1 January 2013 Narva's population was 59,888, down from 60,454 inhabitants a year earlier. The population was 83,000 in 1992. 95.7% of the population of Narva are native Russian speakers, and 87.7% are ethnic Russians. Most non-Estonians are ethnically Russian, Belarusian, or Ukrainian immigrants or the children of immigrants, though 69% of Narva residents in the early 1990s had been born in Narva or had lived there for more than 30 years. Ethnic Estonians account for 5.2% of total population. Much of the city was destroyed during World War II and for several years during the following reconstruction the Soviet authorities largely prohibited return of Narva's pre-war residents (among whom ethnic Estonians had been the majority, forming 64.8% of the town's population of 23,512 according to the 1934 census), thus radically altering the city's ethnic composition. Nevertheless, ethnic Russians had already formed a significant minority: 29.7% of the city's population were Russian in the census of 1934.

46.7% of the city's inhabitants are Estonian citizens, 36.3% are citizens of the Russian Federation, while 15.3% of the population has undefined citizenship. Since the 2022 Russian invasion of Ukraine there has been increased the take up in Estonian citizenship in the city.

A concern in Narva is the spread of HIV, which infected 1.2% of Estonia's population in 2012. Between 2001 and 2008, more than 1,600 cases of HIV were registered in Narva, making it one of the worst areas in Estonia, alongside Tallinn and the rest of Ida-Viru County. The HIV infection rate in Estonia declined in 2014, with 59 new cases in Narva.

Religion

Geography
The eastern border of the city along the Narva river (which drains Lake Peipus) coincides with the Estonian-Russian border. The Estonian part of the Narva Reservoir lies mostly within the territory of Narva, to the southwest of city center.

Climate
Narva has a warm-summer humid continental climate (Köppen climate classification Dfb) with mild to warm, rainy summers with cool nights and  cold, cloudy and snowy winters. Narva is one of the coldest settlements in Estonia, being located at the very northeast of the country and bordering Russia.

Neighbourhoods

Narva is officially divided into 15 neighbourhoods: Elektrijaama, Joaoru, Kalevi, Kerese, Kreenholmi, Kudruküla, Kulgu, Olgina, Paemurru, Pähklimäe, Siivertsi, Soldina, Sutthoffi, Vanalinn and Veekulgu.

Landmarks 

Narva's skyline is dominated by the 15th-century castle, with the  Pikk Hermann tower as its most prominent landmark. The sprawling complex of the Kreenholm Manufacture, located in the proximity of scenic waterfalls, is one of the largest textile mills of 19th-century Northern Europe. Other notable buildings include Swedish mansions of the 17th century, a Baroque town hall (1668–71), and remains of Erik Dahlberg's fortifications.

Across the Narva river lies the Russian Ivangorod fortress, established during the rule of Grand Prince Ivan III of Muscovy in 1492 and also referred to in some contemporary sources as the "Counter-Narva".  From the 17th century until 1945, both the fortress and the adjacent suburb of Ivangorod were an administrative part of Narva. 

Narva Kreenholmi Stadium is home to Meistriliiga football team, FC Narva Trans.

Transportation
The Narva railway station is located on an international railway line between Estonia and Russia (Tallinn–Narva railway). A daily international passenger train used to link (as of 2019) the two countries: the overnight train between Moscow via St. Petersburg to Tallinn, which stops at Narva.
Four daily domestic trains run between Narva and Tallinn - modern trains were introduced in 2016 and now take less than 3 hours between the two cities.
Adjacent to the central rail station is a central bus station, which has multiple domestic and international connections (including to Russia, Latvia, Lithuania, Poland, Belarus etc.). There is a general aviation grass airfield near Narva (ICAO: EENA).

Sport
The two main professional sports in the city are ice hockey and football.

Narva PSK play at the Narva Ice Hall, which also was the host arena of the 2005 World Junior Ice Hockey Division I Championship Group B.

JK Narva Trans play at the Narva Kreenholm Stadium. They are founding members of the Meistriliiga, and are one of two clubs which have never been relegated from the Estonian top division. They have won 2 Estonian Cups and 2 Estonian Supercups.

Notable residents

Evert Horn (1585–1615), governor of Narva (1613)
Ludwig Busbetzky (1687-1699), composer and organist at the German Church in Narva 
Aleksander Promet (1879–1938), artist
Raimund Kull (1882–1942), conductor and composer
Adolf Szyszko-Bohusz (1883–1948), architect
Albert Üksip (1886–1966), botanist
Emmanuel Steinschneider (1886–1970), professor.
Nikolai Stepulov (1913–1968), Olympic boxer
Kersti Merilaas (1913–1986), poet, playwright
Paul Keres (1916–1975), chess grandmaster
Paul Felix Schmidt (1916–1984), chess player
Ortvin Sarapu (1924–1999), chess player
Valeri Karpin (born 1969), Russian football player
Maksim Gruznov (1974), football player
Reinar Hallik (1984), basketball player
Leo Komarov (1987), ice hockey player
Alika Milova (2002), singer

In popular culture

In the first-person shooter video game Squad, the map Narva is loosely based on the real city, containing Narva Castle, Ivangorod Fortress and a southern industrial area.

Friendship and partner cities

Narva is twinned with:

 Bel Air, United States
 Xiamen, China
 Pärnu, Estonia
 Forssa, Finland
 Humppila, Finland
 Jokioinen, Finland
 Lahti, Finland
 Somero, Finland
 Urjala, Finland
 Ypäjä, Finland
 Kobuleti, Georgia
 Bălți, Moldova
 Elbląg, Poland
 Karlskoga, Sweden
 Bel Air, United States

Notes

References

External links

 Narva – Official site
 Visit Narva official city guide

 
Cities and towns in Estonia
Yamburgsky Uyezd
Estonia–Russia border crossings
Populated places in Ida-Viru County
Russian communities
Port cities and towns in Estonia
Extreme points of Estonia